Fred Myton (November 15, 1885 – June 6, 1955) was an American screenwriter. He wrote 168 films between 1916 and 1952, mostly low-budget "B" pictures for Poverty Row studios and independent producers. He wrote many films for Producers Releasing Corporation.

Partial filmography

Barriers of Society (1916)

The Social Buccaneer (1916)
Triumph (1917)
Come Through (1917)
The Empty Gun (1917)
 Fighting Mad (1917)
 Love Aflame (1917)
 Fear Not (1917)
 The Lash of Power (1917)
 The Spotted Lily (1917)
 Follow the Girl (1917)
 The Terror (1917)
 The Devil's Pay Day (1917)
 Heart Strings (1917)
 Fighting for Love (1917)
 Mr. Dolan of New York (1917)
 Princess Virtue (1917)
The Charmer (1917)
All Night (1918)
Maid o' the Storm (1918)
 Shackled (1918)
The Prince and Betty (1919)
Fighting Cressy (1919)
 Desert Gold (1919)
 The Gray Wolf's Ghost (1919)
The Deadlier Sex (1920)
Dice of Destiny (1920)
Felix O'Day (1920)
The Land of Hope (1921)
A Game Chicken (1922)
South of Suva (1922)
Where the North Begins (1923)
The Brass Bottle (1923)
Torment (1924)
The Heart Bandit (1924)
Midnight Molly (1925)
Forbidden Cargo (1925)
Lady Robinhood (1925)
Smooth as Satin (1925)
 Flaming Waters (1925)
Alias Mary Flynn (1925)
Three of a Kind (1925)
Broadway Lady (1925)
Parisian Nights (1925)
The Isle of Retribution (1926)
Queen o'Diamonds (1926)
The Mysterious Rider (1927)
The Wreck of the Singapore (1928)
The Air Legion (1929)
The Voice of the Storm (1929)
 Smoke Bellew (1929)
The Great Divide (1929)
The Gambling Terror (1937)
Harlem on the Prairie (1937)
 Two Gun Justice (1938)
Hitler, Beast of Berlin (1939)
Prairie Schooners (1940)
The Pinto Kid (1941)
White Eagle (1941)
Gentleman from Dixie (1941)
The Lone Prairie (1942)
The Mad Monster (1942)
Dead Men Walk (1943)
Black Hills Express (1943)
Thundering Gun Slingers (1944)
Apology for Murder (1945)
Lady Chaser (1946)
Murder Is My Business (1946)
Too Many Winners (1947)
Western Pacific Agent (1950)
The Gunman (1952)

External links

1885 births
1955 deaths
American male screenwriters
People from Garden City, Kansas
Screenwriters from Kansas
20th-century American male writers
20th-century American screenwriters